Aurangzaib Panhwar is a Pakistani politician who had been a Member of the Provincial Assembly of Sindh, from September 2016 to May 2018.

Early life and education
He was born on 4 June 1980 in Jacobabad.

He has a degree in Master of Arts from Shah Abdul Latif University in Khairpur.

Political career

He was elected to the Provincial Assembly of Sindh as a candidate of Pakistan Peoples Party from Constituency PS-14 JACOBABAD-II in by-polls held in August 2016.

References

Living people
Sindh MPAs 2013–2018
1980 births
Pakistan People's Party politicians